Camilla Johansson may refer to:

Camilla Johansson (curler) (born 1971), Swedish curler now competing as Camilla Noréen
Camilla Johansson (swimmer) (born 1974), Olympic swimmer
Camilla Johansson (triple jumper) (born 1976), Olympic triple jumper